Caenurgia is a genus of moths in the family Erebidae.

Species
 Caenurgia adusta (Walker, 1865)
 Caenurgia chloropha (Hübner, 1818) (syn: Caenurgia convalescens (Guenée, 1852), Caenurgia purgata (Walker, 1858), Caenurgia socors Walker, 1858)
 Caenurgia runica (Felder and Rogenhofer, 1874) (syn: Caenurgia magalhaensi (Staudinger, 1899), Caenurgia tehuelcha (Berg, 1875))
 Caenurgia togataria (Walker, 1862) (syn: Caenurgia adversa (Grote, 1875))

Former species
 Caenurgia camptogramma (Dognin, 1919)
 Caenurgia escondida (Schaus, 1901)
 Caenurgia fortalitium (Tauscher, 1809)
 Caenurgia phasianoides (Guenée, 1852)

References

External links
 
 

 
Euclidiini
Moth genera